Canadian National Team or Team Canada may refer to:

Canada's national sport teams
Canada men's national field hockey team
Canada men's national floorball team
Canada men's national ice hockey team
Canada men's national ice sledge hockey team
Canada men's national junior ice hockey team
Canada men's national soccer team
Canada men's national volleyball team
Canada men's national water polo team
Canada men's national youth soccer teams
Canada men's national basketball team
Canada national ringette team
Canada women's national basketball team
Canada women's national ice hockey team
Canada women's national softball team
Canada women's national soccer team
Canada national quidditch team
Team Canada (roller derby)

Summit series hockey teams
Team Canada, 1972 Summit Series
Team Canada, 1974 Summit Series
Team Canada, on five occasions between 1976 and 1991 for the Canada Cup

Professional wrestling
Team Canada (TNA) (2004–2006), Total Nonstop Action Wrestling
Team Canada (WCW) (2000–2001), World Championship Wrestling
The Un-Americans or Team Canada, World Wrestling Entertainment

Other sports
Team Canada (baseball), a franchise of the Arizona Winter League
Canada at the Olympics

Other
Team Canada (politics)